Resistance Is Futile! How the Trump-Hating Left Lost Its Collective Mind is a 2018 book by Ann Coulter, in which the author argues that the American left has become irrational in its opposition to President Donald Trump.

Summary
Coulter argues that the American left lies to rationalize their animus towards President Trump. She suggests the Democratic Party should pay attention to the needs of working-class Americans, and she contends that the American media are overwhelmingly opposed to President Trump.

Publication
The book was published in August 2018 by Penguin Random House.  It became a best seller.

References

Further reading

External links
 C-SPAN covers book release

2018 non-fiction books
books about Donald Trump
books about media bias
books about the Trump administration
books by Ann Coulter
English-language books
non-fiction books about United States intelligence agencies
Penguin Books books